Finless Foods, or Finless for short, is an American biotechnology company aimed at cultured fish, particularly bluefin tuna.  Finless is the first cell-cultured seafood company, and the first to serve cell-cultured fish in the United States.

History

Origins 

Finless Foods was founded in June 2016 and is headquartered in Emeryville, California. Co-founders Mike Selden (CEO) and Brian Wyrwas (CIO) are both molecular biologists who each other at the University of Massachusetts Amherst. They decided to focus on cultivating bluefin tuna because this species is under threat, and as an expensive food product it is easier to achieve price parity with this fish species. Indie Bio is a biology oriented accelerator program that has invested in Memphis Meats, Geltor, New Age Meats and Finless Foods.

Proof of concept 
In March 2017 the company commenced laboratory operations. CEO Mike Selden said in July 2017 to expect cultured fish products on the market by the end of 2019.

Finless Foods presented its proof of concept, fish croquettes, in September 2017. At the time, the costs were about $19,000 per pound. By February 2018, the company claimed to have been able to reduce production costs to $7,000 per pound.

Seeking regulatory approval 
In August 2019, five startups – Eat Just, Memphis Meats, Finless Foods, BlueNalu, and Fork & Goode – announced the formation of the Alliance for Meat, Poultry & Seafood Innovation (AMPS Innovation), a coalition seeking to work with regulators to create a pathway to market for cultured meat and seafood.

In October 2021, Selden stated that he thought Finless might obtain regulatory approval from the FDA to sell its products within months, perhaps before the end of 2021. FDA officials were said to be very helpful in explaining regulations and giving advice on how to build and operate safe and efficient production facilities, which Finless promptly implemented during the construction of its pilot plant.

Funding 
In March 2022, Finless Foods announced it closed its Series B funding totaling $34 million, led by Hanwha Solutions. Finless raised nearly $48M since 2017. Additional investors include Japanese seafood company, Dainichi Corp, as well as At One Ventures, Olive Tree Capital, Justin Kan, Humboldt, Gaingels, Draper Associates, Sustainable Ocean Alliance, and SOSV.

References

External links

 

Biotechnology companies of the United States
Cellular agriculture
Food and drink companies of the United States